High Impact Games was an American video game developer based in Burbank, California, formed in 2003 by former members of Insomniac Games and Naughty Dog. In 2007, the company released Ratchet & Clank: Size Matters for the PlayStation Portable, with a PlayStation 2 port released the next year, and Secret Agent Clank in 2008, also for the PlayStation Portable. On November 3, 2009, the company released its third game, Jak and Daxter: The Lost Frontier, for the PlayStation Portable and PlayStation 2. The game was based on the Jak & Daxter series made by Naughty Dog. In 2010, High Impact Games was developing a remake of Crash Team Racing for PlayStation 3, Xbox 360 and Wii, but the game was canceled by Activision before the prototype initial.  In 2011 an environmental artist, who had worked on some games, revealed that High Impact Games was working on a new project for the Wii. This game was revealed to be Phineas and Ferb: Across the 2nd Dimension.

Games

References

External links
 

Video game development companies
Video game companies of the United States
Video game companies established in 2003
Companies based in Burbank, California
2003 establishments in California